Al Khuimat is a village in the Jabal al Akhdar district of eastern Libya. Al Khuimat is located about 125 km southwest of Bayda

References

See also 
 List of cities in Libya

Populated places in Jabal al Akhdar